The Continental Cup 2000–01 was the fourth edition of the IIHF Continental Cup. The season started on September 22, 2000, and finished on January 14, 2001.

The tournament was won by ZSC Lions, who won the final group.

Preliminary round

Group A
(Sofia, Bulgaria)

Group A standings

Group B
(Belgrade, FR Yugoslavia)

Group B standings

Group C
(Miercurea Ciuc, Romania)

Group C standings

Group D
(Volán, Hungary)

Group D standings

Group E
(Caen, France)

Group E standings

First Group Stage

Group F
(Milan, Italy)

Group F standings

Group G
(Ljubljana, Slovenia)

Group G standings

Group H
(Dunaújváros, Hungary)

Group H standings

Group J
(Oświęcim, Poland)

Group J standings

Group K
(Liepājas, Latvia)

Group K standings

Group L
(Frederikshavn, Denmark)

*: Match was suspended and never played

Group L standings

 HC Ambrì-Piotta,
 München Barons,
 HC Oceláři Třinec,
 HC Slovan Bratislava,
 Storhamar Dragons,
 London Knights    :  bye

Second Group Stage

Group M
(Ambrì, Switzerland)

Group M standings

Group N
(Bratislava, Slovakia)

Group N standings

Group O
(Hamar, Norway)

Group O standings

 ZSC Lions    :  bye

Final Group Stage
(Zürich, Switzerland)

Final Group standings

References
 Continental Cup 2001

2000–01 in European ice hockey
IIHF Continental Cup